Glaphyriinae is a subfamily of the lepidopteran family Crambidae. It was described by William Trowbridge Merrifield Forbes in 1923. The subfamily currently comprises 509 species in 75 genera.

The larvae of Glaphyriinae predominantly feed on plants of the order Brassicales and are able to digest the glucosinolates contained in these plants.

Genera
Abegesta Munroe, 1964
Achantodes Guenée, 1852
Aenigmodes Amsel, 1957 (= Aenigma Amsel, 1956)
Aethiophysa Munroe, 1964
Agastya Moore, 1881 (= Agastia Moore, 1881)
Aureopteryx Amsel, 1956
Catharia Lederer, 1863
Cereophagus Dyar, 1922
Chalcoela Zeller, 1872
Chilomima Munroe, 1964
Chilozela Munroe, 1964
Contortipalpia Munroe, 1964
Cosmopterosis Amsel, 1956
Dichochroma Forbes, 1944
Dicymolomia Zeller, 1872 (= Bifalculina Amsel, 1956)
Eupoca Warren, 1891
Eustixia Hübner, 1823 (= Thelcteria Lederer, 1863, Thlecteria Dyar, 1925)
Evergestis Hübner, 1825
Gonodiscus Warren, 1891
Homophysodes Dyar, 1914
Lativalva Amsel, 1956
Lipocosma Lederer, 1863 (= Clarkeiodes Amsel, 1957, Clarkeia Amsel, 1956, Lipocosmopsis Munroe, 1964)
Lipocosmodes Munroe, 1964
Lissophanes Warren, 1891
Macreupoca Munroe, 1964
Nephrogramma Munroe, 1964
Parambia Dyar, 1914
Paregesta Munroe, 1964
Plumegesta Munroe, 1972
Psephis Guenée, 1854
Pseudoligostigma Strand, 1920 (= Heptalitha Munroe, 1964)
Schacontia Dyar, 1914
Scybalista Lederer, 1863
Scybalistodes Munroe, 1964
Stegea Munroe, 1964 (= Egesta Ragonot, 1891)
Upiga Capps, 1964
Vinculopsis Amsel, 1957 (= Vincularia Amsel, 1956)
Xanthophysa Munroe, 1964

Tribe Dichogamini Amsel, 1956
Alatuncusia Amsel, 1956
Alatuncusiodes Munroe, 1974
Dichogama Lederer, 1863 (= Carbaca Walker, 1866)

Tribe Glaphyriini Forbes, 1923
Glaphyria Hübner, 1823 (= Berdura Möschler, 1886, Glaphria Fernald, 1903, Homophysa Guenée, 1854)
Hellula Guenée, 1854 (= Ashwania Pajni & Rose, 1977, Oeobia Hübner, 1825, Oebia Hübner, 1825, Phyratocosma Meyrick, 1936)

References

 , 2012: "A molecular phylogeny for the pyraloid moths (Lepidoptera: Pyraloidea) and its implications for higher-level classification". Systematic Entomology. 37 (4): 635–656. Abstract: .
  2009: "Transfer of All Western Hemisphere Cybalomiinae to Other Subfamilies (Crambidae: Pyraloidea: Lepidoptera): Elusia Schaus, Dichochroma Forbes, Schacontia Dyar, Cybalomia extorris Warren, and C. lojanalis (Dognin)". Proceedings of the Entomological Society of Washington. 111 (2): 493–504.
  & , 1998b: "Review of the Costa Rican Glaphyriinae (Lepidoptera: Pyraloidea: Crambidae)". Journal of the New York Entomological Society. 106 (1): 1-55.
 , 2009: "Phylogenetic Analysis of Cosmopterosis (Lepidoptera: Crambidae: Glaphyriinae) with Discussions on Male Secondary Sexual Characters and Larval Feeding on Capparis (Capparaceae) in the Pyraloidea and Lepidoptera (Insecta)". Annals of the Entomological Society of America 102 (5): 766–784. Abstract: .

 
Crambidae